Touki Bouki (Wolof for The Journey of the Hyena) is a 1973 Senegalese drama film, directed by Djibril Diop Mambéty. It was shown at the 1973 Cannes Film Festival and the 8th Moscow International Film Festival.

The film was restored in 2008 at Cineteca di Bologna / L’Immagine Ritrovata Laboratory by the World Cinema Foundation. It was selected as the 93rd greatest film of all time by the Sight and Sound Critic's Poll.

Plot
Mory, a cowherd who drives a motorcycle mounted with a bull-horned skull, and Anta, a student, meet in Dakar. Alienated and tired of life in Senegal, they dream of going to Paris and come up with different schemes to raise money for the trip. Mory eventually succeeds in stealing the money, and a large amount of clothing, from the household of a wealthy homosexual while the latter is taking a shower. Anta and Mory can finally buy tickets for the ship to France. But their wealthy victim phones the police who begin to tail the duo, and when Anta and Mory board the ship in the Port of Dakar, the loudspeaker summons Mory to see the captain. Upon hearing this, Mory leaves Anta and runs away madly to find his bull-horned motorcycle, only to see that it has been ruined in a crash that nearly killed the rider who had taken it. The ship sails away with Anta but not Mory, who sits next to his hat on the ground, staring disconsolately at his wrecked motorcycle.

Cast
 Aminata Fall as Aunt Oumy
 Ousseynou Diop as Charlie
 Magaye Niang as Mory
 Mareme Niang as Anta

Production

Based on his own story and script, Djibril Diop Mambéty made Touki Bouki with a budget of $30,000 – obtained in part from the Senegalese government. Though influenced by French New Wave, Touki Bouki displays a style all its own. Its camerawork and soundtrack have a frenetic rhythm uncharacteristic of most African films – known for their often deliberately slow-paced, linearly evolving narratives. However, it has been asserted that the jump cuts and radical spatial shifts of the film are inspired by African oral traditions. The word "Bouki" in the title refers to a popular folk character, known for causing mischief and cheating his way to what he wants. Through jump cuts, colliding montage, dissonant sonic accompaniment, and the juxtaposition of premodern, pastoral and modern sounds and visual elements, Touki Bouki conveys and grapples with the hybridization of Senegal.

West African cinema contemporaneous with Touki Bouki was primarily financed and distributed by the French Ministry of Cooperation's Bureau du Cinema, which ensured that scripts had to conform to cinematographic standards acceptable to the French Government. Touki Bouki, in contrast, was made without any French financial assistance, allowing Mambéty relatively significant autonomy in production of the film. Mambéty's ready adoption of French New Wave techniques was to a degree motivated by meagre financial resources, circumstances similar to those of the film-makers of the early French New Wave. Narrative and cinematographic techniques associated with the Western genre (known for dehumanizing depictions of Native Americans and minorities) were also subversively utilized by Mambéty in the production of the film.

During the production of Touki Bouki, Mambéty was arrested for participating in anti-racist protests in Rome, and bailed out by lawyers from the Italian Communist Party after appeals from friends such as Bernardo Bertolucci and Sophia Loren. The experience of receiving a request from the Italian Communist Party to compensate them for the legal fees spent in his defence served as an inspiration for a character in his later film, Hyènes.

See also
 Cinema of Senegal

Awards
 International Critics Award at 1973 Cannes Film Festival
 Special Jury Award at 1973 Moscow Film Festival
 Touki Bouki ranked #52 in Empire magazine's "The 100 Best Films Of World Cinema" in 2010.

References

External links
 
 
 
 
 
 
 
Touki bouki: Mambéty and Modernity an essay by Richard Porton at the Criterion Collection

1973 films
Senegalese drama films
Wolof-language films
Films directed by Djibril Diop Mambéty
Films shot in Senegal
Films set in Senegal
Afrofuturist films